Events from the year 1935 in Denmark.

Incumbents
 Monarch – Christian X
 Prime minister – Thorvald Stauning

Events

Sports
 15 March – Amager Badminton Club is founded.

Cycling
 Willy Hansen (DEN) and Viktor Rausch (GER) win the second Six Days of Copenhagen sox-day track cycling race.

Football
 B 93 wins tyheir sixth Danish football championship by winning the 1934–35 Danish Championship League.

Births
 16 January – Inger Christensen, poet (died 2009)
 18 March – Ole Barndorff-Nielsen, mathematician (died 2022)
 22 October – Inge Eriksen, writer and political activist (died 2015)
 1 November – Svend Jakobsen, politician (died 2022)
 18 November – Erling Mandelmann, photographer (died 2018)

Deaths
 15 April – Anna Ancher, painter (born 1859)
 11 May – Nanna Liebmann, composer and music critic (born 1849)
 7 July – Karen Jeppe, missionary and social worker (born 1876)
 5 September – Carl Moltke, Danish nobleman, minister to the United States in 1908, Minister of Foreign Affairs 1924–1926 (born 1869)
 3 October – Georg Jensen, silver smith and designer (born 1866)
 18 December – Viggo Johansen, painter (born 1851)

References

 
Denmark
1930s in Denmark
1935 in Europe
Years of the 20th century in Denmark